The 2006–07 Interliga season was the eighth and final season of the multi-national ice hockey league. A total of 10 teams participated, five in Group A, and five in Group B. Alba Volan Szekesfehervar have won Group A and Jesenice have won Group B.

Group A

Regular season

Play-offs

Quarter-finals

Semi-finals

Final

Group B

Regular season

Play-offs

Quarter-finals

Semi-finals

Final

External links
Season on www.hockeyarchives.info

2006–07 in European ice hockey leagues
Interliga (1999–2007) seasons